Jane Dodds MS (born 13 September 1963) is a Welsh politician who has served as Leader of the Welsh Liberal Democrats since 2017. She was elected as the Member of Parliament (MP) for Brecon and Radnorshire at the seat's 2019 by-election, but was an MP for only three months before being defeated in the general election later the same year. In May 2021, Dodds was elected to the Senedd on the Mid and West Wales list. This made her the only Welsh Liberal Democrat Member of the Senedd (MS) in the 6th Senedd.

Early and personal life 
Dodds was born and raised in a Welsh-speaking family in Wrexham, North Wales. She attended Ysgol Morgan Llwyd before studying social care at Cardiff University. After university she trained to become a social worker, and worked for the Salvation Army in Child Protective Services for 27 years before being elected. During this time she also worked in a number of local authorities and for Cafcass, and also at one stage led the Children's Section of the Refugee Council.

She currently lives in Hay-on-Wye with her husband Patrick.

Political career

London
Dodds moved to London in early 2000 and was a member of the Labour Party until 2003. Being a strong opponent of military intervention, she left the party following its decision to take part in the invasion of Iraq in early 2003. In 2005 she joined the Liberal Democrats following a meeting with Susan Kramer – who was at the time the Liberal Democrat MP for Richmond Park – and quickly became active in the local Richmond party.

Dodds stood for Richmond upon Thames London Borough Council for the Liberal Democrats in the 2006 local elections, and was elected as one of three councillors in the North Richmond ward. In 2008 she was appointed as Cabinet Member for Performance in the Lib Dem-run administration, where she was responsible for the performance of the authority and ensuring that residents obtained value for money. She narrowly failed to retain her seat in 2010 by a narrow margin of 19 votes, despite obtaining the highest vote among the three Liberal Democrat candidates.

She also contested a by-election for the same ward in 2012, following the resignation of one of the sitting Conservative councillors. During the by-election she was the victim of false leaflets produced in her name, which were produced to look like official Liberal Democrat literature. She narrowly missed out on re-election by 146 votes.

Wales

In November 2012, Dodds returned to Wales and moved to Welshpool to help care for her elderly mother. Early the following year she was selected as the parliamentary candidate for Montgomeryshire, which Alex Carlile and later Lembit Öpik had held for the Liberal Democrats from 1983 to 2010. Dodds contested the seat in both the 2015 and 2017 general elections, as well as the Welsh Assembly constituency of Montgomeryshire in 2016. She came second on all three occasions, the Welsh Conservatives retaining both seats.

Dodds was elected as the Welsh Liberal Democrats Leader in November 2017, defeating Aberaeron Councillor Elizabeth Evans by 13% in an all-member ballot.

In March 2019, Dodds was selected as the party's Westminster candidate for Brecon and Radnorshire. As candidate for the constituency, Dodds attacked then-Conservative leadership candidate Boris Johnson's comments about immigrant communities where English is allegedly not spoken as a first language, describing Johnson, in Welsh, as out of touch with communities in Wales. Dodds won the by-election on 1 August 2019. After serving for 97 days, she failed to retain her seat at the general election of 12 December, becoming one of the shortest-serving members at Westminster. The female MPs with the shortest continuous service are Labour's Ruth Dalton in 1929, at 92 days, and the Scottish National Party's Margo MacDonald who subsequently equalled that in 1973–74.

Dodds led her party into the 2021 Senedd election and gained a seat on the list vote in Mid and West Wales, the only seat in the Senedd to be retained by the party. The seat was only held by 714 votes.

Westminster elections

See also
 List of United Kingdom MPs with the shortest service

References

External links

 Official website
 

1963 births
Living people
Alumni of Cardiff University
People educated at Ysgol Morgan Llwyd
Female members of the Parliament of the United Kingdom for Welsh constituencies
Female members of the Senedd
Labour Party (UK) people
Liberal Democrat members of the Senedd
Liberal Democrats (UK) councillors
Liberal Democrats (UK) MPs for Welsh constituencies
People from Wrexham
UK MPs 2017–2019
Wales MSs 2021–2026
Welsh-speaking politicians
21st-century British women politicians
Councillors in the London Borough of Richmond upon Thames